Bob Hewitt and Billie Jean King were the defending champions but both players chose not to participate.

Jean-Claude Barclay and Françoise Dürr won in the final 6–2, 6–4 against Toomas Leius and Winnie Shaw.

Seeds

Draw

Finals

Top half

Section 1

Section 2

Bottom half

Section 3

Section 4

References

External links
1971 French Open – Doubles draws and results at the International Tennis Federation

Mixed Doubles
French Open by year – Mixed doubles